(born Choi Young-ii June 3, 1980) is a Japanese professional wrestler, mixed martial artist and promoter who currently owns and operates Pro Wrestling Land's End, where he is a former All Asia Heavyweight Champion. He is best known for working for Pro Wrestling Zero1, where he is a former two-time World Heavyweight Champion.

He is the older brother of mixed martial artist Young Choi.

Career
Ryoji Sai is a 3rd Generation Zainichi Korean that was born in Osaka, Japan. His parents own a restaurant near Tsuruhashi Station in Osaka. At 15 years old, Ryouji attended the Sidmouth International School in Sidmouth, England. He then attended Bloxham School in Oxfordshire between 1996 and 1999. While in Europe he studied martial arts under Gerard Gordeau in the Netherlands.

When he returned to Japan he joined Pro Wrestling ZERO-ONE, debuting on September 1, 2001 at the ZERO-ONE "FIRE FESTIVAL 2001" versus Igor Meindert. in a non-tournament match. From 2002 to 2004, he would be out of pro wrestling with an unknown ailment. Returning in 2004, he would begin to regularly team with Kohei Sato winning the NWA Intercontinental Tag Team Championship in 2005 and 2006.

Ryoji twice finished as the runner-up in ZERO1 Fire Festival tournaments in both 2007 and 2006, losing to Masato Tanaka. He also regularly appeared for the HUSTLE wrestling promotion during Pro Wrestling ZERO1's working agreement with them. In late 2008 and early 2009, Sai took part on the popular Japan Fuji TV show Ainori (あいのり) under the name of "Wrestler" (レスラー).

Championships and accomplishments
All Japan Pro Wrestling
World Tag Team Championship (2 times) – with Dylan James (1) & Zeus (1)
Apache Pro-Wrestling Army
WEW World Tag Team Championship (1 time) – with Tetsuhiro Kuroda

HUSTLE
Hustle Super Tag Team Championship (1 time) – with Wataru Sakata

Pro Wrestling Land's End
All Asia Heavyweight Championship (1 time)
Pro Wrestling Illustrated
Ranked No. 220 of the top 500 singles wrestlers in the PWI 500 in 2014
Pro Wrestling Zero1
NWA Intercontinental Tag Team Championship (3 times) – with Kohei Sato (2) and Osamu Namiguchi (1)
NWA United National Heavyweight Championship (1 time)
World Heavyweight Championship (2 times)
Fire Festival (2009, 2014)
Passion Cup Tag Tournament (2008) – with Kohei Sato

MMA record

|-
| Loss
| align="center"| 1-1-1 (1)
| Kenichi Serizawa
| TKO (Punches)
| Titan Fighting Championship 2
| 
| align='center'| 2
| align='center'| 3:32
| Tokyo, Japan
| 
|-
| Win
| align="center"| 1-0-1 (1)
| Koichi Sato
| TKO (Punches)
| Titan Fighting Championship 2
| 
| align='center'| 1
| align='center'| 2:54
| Tokyo, Japan
| 
|-
| NC
| align="center"| 0-0-1 (1)
| Koichi Sato
| No contest (illegal knees)
| Titan Fighting Championship 2
| 
| align="center"| 1
| align="center"| 0:26
| Tokyo, Japan
| 
|-
| Draw
| align=center| 0–0–1
| Masakazu Imanari
| Technical Draw
| Titan Fighting Championship 1
| 
| align=center| 1
| align=center| 1:29
| Tokyo, Japan
| 
|}

References

External links 

 ZERO1 USA English language website
 ZERO1 Japanese language website
 Sai's Official Japanese language blog

1980 births
Living people
Japanese people of Korean descent
Japanese male professional wrestlers
Sportspeople from Osaka
Zainichi Korean people
World Tag Team Champions (AJPW)
WEW World Tag Team Champions
21st-century professional wrestlers
All Asia Heavyweight Champions